Stanislav Semonov (born 8 December 1990) is a Russian judoka.

He is the gold medallist of the 2018 Judo Grand Prix Tunis in the -81 kg category.

References

External links
 

1990 births
Living people
Russian male judoka
21st-century Russian people